Shaena Lambert (born 1959) is a Canadian novelist and short story writer.

Biography
Born in Vancouver, British Columbia in 1959, she has lived in Toronto, New York City and the Okanagan. She currently lives in Vancouver, with her husband, political consultant Bob Penner. They have two children.

Lambert's writing has appeared in many prominent periodicals and literary journals including Ploughshares, Zoetrope: All-Story, Toronto Life and The Walrus. Her stories have been anthologised four times in Best Canadian Stories, published by Oberon Press, and have been anthologized in The Journey Prize Anthology. 

Her first book, a collection of short stories titled The Falling Woman. was published in 2002 by Random House Canada to widespread critical acclaim. In 2003 it was published by Virago Press in the United Kingdom and Berlin Verlag in Germany. The Hamilton Spectator wrote of The Falling Woman: "In Shaena Lambert we have a writer with the ability to layer experience so that one layer comments on another, a writer with Alice Munro's understanding of the human heart and Yann Martel's gift for inhabiting the minds of vastly different characters." The Falling Woman was a finalist for The Danuta Gleed Award and was chosen as a Globe and Mail best book for 2002.

Lambert's novel, Radiance, was published in 2007 by Random House Canada, and by Virago Press in the U.K, again meeting with critical acclaim, and comparisons to Canadian writers Alice Munro and Carol Shields. Writing in The Globe and Mail, American novelist Richard Bausch called Radiance "a marvellous feat of imagining". Radiance tells the story of Hiroshima survivor named Keiko Kitigawa, who travels to the U.S. from Japan after the end of World War II, and the complex relationship she has with a Long Island housewife. Radiance was nominated for the Rogers Writers' Trust Fiction Prize in 2007; the Ethel Wilson Fiction Prize in 2008; and was a Globe and Mail Best Book.

Lambert's collection of stories, Oh, My Darling,  was published by HarperCollins Canada in 2013. It was a Globe and Mail Best Book of 2013, a National Post Best Book of 2013, and was longlisted for the Frank O'Connor Award for the Short Story.

Lambert's novel, Petra, Random House Canada, 2020, is a fictional exploration of the life and death of Petra Kelly, the Green Party leader and political activist who fought for the planet and human rights in 1980s Germany at the height of the Cold War.

References

External links
Author's web site
Interview by Linda Richards January Magazine
Profile The Georgia Straight

Living people
Canadian women novelists
Writers from Vancouver
1959 births
21st-century Canadian novelists
Canadian women short story writers
21st-century Canadian women writers
21st-century Canadian short story writers
Canadian expatriates in the United States